Natica monodi is a species of predatory sea snails, a marine gastropod mollusk in the family Naticidae, also known as moon snails.

Description
The length of the shell attains 25.3 mm.

Distribution
This marine species occurs off Senegal.

References

 Gofas, S., Afonso, J.P. & Brandào, M. (1985). Conchas e Moluscos de Angola = Coquillages et Mollusques d'Angola. [Shells and molluscs of Angola]. Universidade Agostinho / Elf Aquitaine Angola: Angola. 140 pp. Printed without date.

External links
 Marche-Marchad, I. (1957). Description de cinq Gastropodes marins nouveaux de la côte occidentale d'Afrique. Bulletin du Muséum National d'Histoire Naturelle, Paris. ser. 2, 29(2): 200-205, 1 pl

Naticidae